James Douglas Unnever (born January 9, 1953) is an American criminologist and professor of criminology at the University of South Florida Sarasota-Manatee. In 2010, he was ranked the 5th most innovative author in the US of papers for criminology and criminal justice journals. He is known for his work on race and crime in the United States, such as the relationship between racial resentment and public support for punitive policies.

References

External links
Faculty page

1953 births
Living people
University of South Florida faculty
New Mexico State University alumni
University of Florida alumni
Duke University alumni
American criminologists